Ben Ben Yair (born 23 December 1992) is an Israeli footballer who plays for Hapoel Bnei Lod in the Liga Alef.

Ben Yair started his career at Maccabi Tel Aviv youth system. On August 27, 2012, he made his debut at the senior team 2–1 victory against Maccabi Haifa. In January 2013, he went on loan to Hapoel Ramat Gan and half a year later he moved to Ironi Nir Ramat HaSharon.

On June 29, 2014, signed to Maccabi Petah Tikva.

External links

1992 births
Living people
Israeli footballers
Association football wingers
Maccabi Tel Aviv F.C. players
Hapoel Ramat Gan F.C. players
Hapoel Nir Ramat HaSharon F.C. players
Maccabi Petah Tikva F.C. players
Hapoel Petah Tikva F.C. players
F.C. Ashdod players
Hapoel Bnei Lod F.C. players
Israeli Premier League players
Liga Leumit players
People from Beit Shemesh